St. James Episcopal Church and Rectory is an historic Carpenter Gothic-style Episcopal church and its rectory located in Kittrell, Vance County, North Carolina. It consists of a gable roof main block, three bays long, with a vestibule attached to the front and a small chapel added to the north end. Atop the roof is a belfry. It was built in 1872 and consecrated in 1878.  The rectory is located directly behind the church and also has board and batten walls.

On December 14, 1978, it was added to the National Register of Historic Places.

References

External links
 St. James Episcopal Church on Flickr
 St. James Church at Waymarking

Episcopal church buildings in North Carolina
Churches on the National Register of Historic Places in North Carolina
Carpenter Gothic church buildings in North Carolina
Churches completed in 1872
Churches in Vance County, North Carolina
National Register of Historic Places in Vance County, North Carolina